There are numerous codes of football in Victoria.

For Australian rules football see Australian rules football in Victoria. The main organising body is the Victorian Football League.
For Association football see Association football in Victoria.  The main organising body is Football Federation Victoria.
For Rugby league football see the main organising body, the Victorian Rugby League.